The following is a list of 1991 Seattle Mariners draft picks. The Mariners took part in the June regular draft, also known as the Rule 4 draft. The Mariners made 67 selections in the 1991 draft, the first being left-handed pitcher Shawn Estes in the first round. In all, the Mariners selected 33 pitchers, 14 outfielders, 12 shortstops, 6 catchers, 1 first baseman, and 1 third baseman.

Draft

Key

Table

References
General references

Inline citations

External links
Seattle Mariners official website